Dieter Wohlfahrt (27 May 1941 in Berlin; died 9 December 1961) was an escape helper and the first non-German and non West Berlin resident to die at the Berlin Wall.

Life 
Wohlfahrt grew up in the GDR in Hohen Neuendorf. After high school he studied from 1961 chemistry at the Technical University of Berlin. Through his father he had the Austrian citizenship. Because of his nationality he could move freely between the two parts of Berlin and used this opportunity to help students to escape. At first he helped them to escape through the sewers until blocking measures made this impossible. Then he started to cut holes in the border fence at secluded places.

Death 
On 9 December 1961 he cut, along with others, a hole in a fence between Staaken and Spandau, to help the mother of an acquaintance to the appointed escape. However, the mother had betrayed the plans to the authorities of the GDR. The GDR border guards shot at Wohlfahrth and his companions. Wohlfahrt was hit by a bullet into the heart and remained in the border area for one hour without medical care before succumbing to his injuries.

Commemoration 

To commemorate Wohlfahrt a wooden cross was erected  directly near the wall with a memorial plaque and a photo in Berlin-Spandau.

See also 
 List of deaths at the Berlin Wall
 Berlin Crisis of 1961

Literature 
 Brecht, Christine: Dieter Wohlfahrt, in: Die Todesopfer an der Berliner Mauer 1961–1989, Links, Berlin 2009, S. 60–63.

Links 
 
 Kurzportrait on  www.chronik-der-mauer.de

References 

People from Oberhavel
1941 births
1961 deaths
Deaths at the Berlin Wall
Technical University of Berlin alumni
People from Bezirk Potsdam
German people of Austrian descent
People with acquired Austrian citizenship
German activists